Årdal Fotballklubb is a Norwegian football club from Øvre Årdal in Årdal municipality, founded on 9 October 2003 as a merger between the football branches of IL Jotun and Årdalstangen IL on senior level. The club was known as Jotun Årdalstangen FK until late 2005.

As of 2020, the men's team currently plays in the 3. divisjon, the 4th tier of the Norwegian football league system, having last played in the 2. divisjon in 2006.

The women's team plays in the lower divisions.

History

Results, men's team
{|class="wikitable"
|-bgcolor="#efefef"
! Season
!
! Pos.
! Pl.
! W
! D
! L
! GS
! GA
! P
!Cup
!Notes
|-
|2004
|2. Division, section 2
|align=right |9
|align=right|26||align=right|9||align=right|6||align=right|11
|align=right|45||align=right|49||align=right|33
|1st round
|
|-
|2005
|2. divisjon, section 3
|align=right |7
|align=right|26||align=right|10||4||align=right|12
|align=right|34||align=right|44||align=right|34
|1st round
|
|-
|2006
|2. divisjon, section 1
|align=right bgcolor=red|14
|align=right|26||align=right|5||align=right|3||align=right|18
|align=right|38||align=right|69||align=right|18
|2nd round
|Relegated to 3. Division
|-
|2007
|3. divisjon, section Sogn og Fjordane
|align=right bgcolor=gold|1
|align=right|22||align=right|17||align=right|2||align=right|3
|align=right|85||align=right|36||align=right|53
|2nd qualifying round
|lost playoffs for promotion
|-
|2008
||3. divisjon, section Sogn og Fjordane
|align=right|2
|align=right|22||align=right|11||align=right|7||align=right|4
|align=right|61||align=right|31||align=right|40
|1st qualifying round
|
|-
|2009
||3. divisjon, section Sogn og Fjordane
|align=right|3
|align=right|22||align=right|15||align=right|0||align=right|5
|align=right|63||align=right|34||align=right|45
|1st qualifying round
|
|-
|2010
||3. divisjon, section Sogn og Fjordane
|align=right |4
|align=right|22||align=right|13||align=right|3||align=right|6
|align=right|61||align=right|41||align=right|42
|1st round||
|-
|2011
||3. divisjon, section 8
|align=right |4
|align=right|26||align=right|13||align=right|5||align=right|8
|align=right|44||align=right|37||align=right|44
|1st qualifying round
|
|-
|2012
||3. divisjon, section 8
|align=right |6
|align=right|26||align=right|13||align=right|3||align=right|10
|align=right|57||align=right|47||align=right|42
|2nd qualifying round
|
|-
|2013
||3. divisjon, section 8
| |
|||||||||||
||
|2nd qualifying round
|
|}

References

External links
 Official site
 Club history

Football clubs in Norway
Association football clubs established in 2003
Sport in Sogn og Fjordane
2003 establishments in Norway